Judie is a variant spelling of Judy or Judi. As such, it is a feminine personal name which is sometimes a given name, but more commonly a hypocorism (affectionate diminutive). When a hypocorism, it is usually a shortening of the given name Judith.

People named Judie include:
Judie Aronson (born 1964), American actress
Judie Bamber (born 1961), American painter
Judie Brown (born 1944), American anti-abortion activist
Judie Byrd, American television chef
Judie Garcia (born 1960), American television reporter and anchor
Judie Tzuke (born 1956), British singer

See also
Judy (disambiguation)
Judy (personal name)
Judi
Judith (disambiguation)

Feminine given names
Hypocorisms